Scarlat Grigorie Ghica (1715 – 2 December 1766) was a Prince of Moldavia (2 March 1757 – 7 August 1758), and twice Prince of Wallachia (August 1758 – 5 June 1761; 18 August 1765 – 2 December 1766). He was a member of the Ghica family.

He was the son of Grigore II Ghica. His brother was Matei Ghica.

He married three times. First he married Ecaterina, the daughter of Mihail Racovita voda. From this marriage he had a son, Alexandru Ghica, hospodar of Wallachia. Next he married Eufrosina and finally Ruxandra, daughter of George Muruzi and Casandra Ypsilanti. From his third marriage he had a daughter, Elena, who married Alexandru Callimachi, Prince of Moldavia. Their son was Scarlat Callimachi of Moldavia.

References 

Scarlat
1715 births
1766 deaths
Rulers of Moldavia
Rulers of Moldavia and Wallachia
Rulers of Wallachia